An octuple champion is a boxer who has won major world titles in eight different weight classes. Manny Pacquiao is the only boxer in history to have won twelve major world titles in eight different weight divisions.

Pacquiao achieved the feat when he defeated Antonio Margarito via a unanimous decision to win the WBC super welterweight title on November 13, 2010 at the Cowboys Stadium, Arlington, Texas, USA.

Nine of his world championships came from the "Big Four" sanctioning bodies (WBA, WBC, IBF, WBO) and three were from The Ring.

He also won the prestigious and coveted lineal championship in five different weight divisions: flyweight, featherweight, super featherweight, light welterweight, and welterweight.

The following are the major world titles won by Pacquiao (arranged chronologically). Titles are listed only once per organization per weight class:

See also
List of current world boxing champions
List of boxing triple champions
List of boxing quadruple champions
List of boxing quintuple champions
List of boxing sextuple champions
List of boxing septuple champions
List of WBA world champions
List of WBC world champions
List of IBF world champions
List of WBO world champions
List of The Ring world champions

References

8
Octuple